Turpal Tokaev (born 20 November 1984) is Russian kickboxer and actor of Chechen descent. Also known as Bahadir Sari and Theodore Sariyev, ISKA oriental kickboxing rules heavyweight world champion in 2010.

Biography and career
He was Kazakhstan captain of national Muay Thai team, winning medals at practically all the competitions he participated. He fought for Kazakhstan under name of Teodor Sariyev, fought for Turkey under name of Bahadir Sari and now fighting and living in Russia under the name of Turpal Tokaev.

Titles
2018 WKF Superheavyweight World Champion (+96.5 kg) Champion
2017 Tatneft Arena World Cup 2017 (+80 kg) Champion
2010 ISKA Oriental Rules Heavyweight World Champion -96.4 kg 
2009 ISKA Oriental Rules Heavyweight Turkish Champion 
2009 WKN World Grand Prix Turkey Tournament Champion
2006 WMC King's Cup Champion
2006 IFMA World Championship Runner Up 
Championship of Kazakhstan 2005, 2006
International Tournament for President Cup Kazakhstan 2005, 2006

Professional kickboxing record

|-
|-  bgcolor="#CCFFCC"
| 2018-08-16 || Win ||align=left| Mateusz Duczmal || Akhmat Fight Show || Grozny, Russia || Decision (Unanimous) || 5 || 3:00
|-
! style=background:white colspan=9 |
|-  bgcolor="#CCFFCC"
| 2017-12-14 || Win ||align=left| Petr Romankevich || Tatneft Cup 2017 - Final || Kazan, Russia || Decision (Unanimous) || 4 || 3:00
|-
! style=background:white colspan=9 |
|- 
|-  bgcolor="#CCFFCC"
| 2017-10-27 || Win ||align=left| Dawid Żółtaszek || Tatneft Cup 2017 - Semi finals|| Kazan, Russia || TKO (Right low kick) || 3 || 
|-
|-  bgcolor="#CCFFCC"
| 2017-07-20 || Win ||align=left| Tomislav Malenica || Tatneft Cup 2017 - 1st selection 1/4 final|| Kazan, Russia || TKO (Strikes)|| 3 || 
|-
|-  bgcolor="#CCFFCC"
| 2017-06-23 || Win ||align=left| Bruno Susano || Akhmat Fight Show|| Grozny, Russia  || TKO (Strikes)|| 2 || 
|-
|-  bgcolor="#CCFFCC"
| 2017-04-22 || Win ||align=left| Mantas Rimdeika || Tatneft Cup 2017 - 2nd selection 1/8 final|| Kazan, Russia || TKO (Low kicks)|| 4 || 
|-
|-  bgcolor="#CCFFCC"
| 2017-02-18 || Win ||align=left| Abdarhmane Coulibaly || W5 Grand Prix Kitek XXXIX || Moscow, Russia || TKO (referee stoppage) || 3 || 
|-
|-  bgcolor="#CCFFCC"
| 2016-08-23 || Win || align=left| Sergei Gur|| Akhmat Fight Show || Grozny, Russia || KO || 2 || 
|-
|-  bgcolor="#FFBBBB"
| 2015-05-29 || Loss ||align=left| Daniel Lentie || Tatneft Cup 2015 2nd selection 1/4 final || Kazan, Russia || Decision || 4 || 3:00
|-
|-  bgcolor="#CCFFCC"
| 2015-04-25 || Win ||align=left| Antonio Dvorak || Absolute Championship Berkut 17 || Grozny, Russia || KO || 2 || 
|-
|-  bgcolor="#CCFFCC"
| 2014-12-07 || Win ||align=left| Farid Shabanov || Tatneft Cup 2015 1st selection 1/8 final || Kazan, Russia || TKO || 1 || 
|-
|-  bgcolor="#CCFFCC"
| 2014-03-07 || Win ||align=left| Giannis Stoforidis || AKIN Dövüş Arenası KickBoxing Event || Turkey || Decision || 3 || 3:00
|-
|-  bgcolor="#FFBBBB"
| 2014-01-31 || Loss ||align=left| Tomasz Sarara || Tatneft Cup 2014 – 2nd selection 1/8 final || Kazan, Russia || Ext. R. Decision (Unanimous) || 4 || 3:00
|-
|-  bgcolor="CCFFCC"
| 2012-12-01 || Win ||align=left| Mantas Rimdeika || Tatneft Cup 2013 - 2nd selection 1/8 final || Kazan, Russia || KO || 1 ||
|-
|-  bgcolor="#CCFFCC"
| 2010-12-19 || Win ||align=left| Daniil Sapljoshin || Tatneft Cup 2011 1st selection 1/8 final || Kazan, Russia || KO (Right hook) || 1 || 
|-
|-  bgcolor="#FFBBBB"
| 2010-08-14 || Loss ||align=left| Ekber Şekbi || Ergen Ring Ateşi -13 || Van, Turkey ||  ||  || 
|-
|-  bgcolor="CCFFCC"
| 2010-01-10 || Win ||align=left| Eric Sauer ||  || Adana, Turkey || KO || 2 ||
|-
! style=background:white colspan=9 |
|-
|-  bgcolor="#CCFFCC"
| 2009-12-26 || Win ||align=left| Goran Vidaković || Ergen Ring Ateşi 11  || Erzurum, Turkey || TKO || 1 ||
|-
|-  bgcolor="CCFFCC"
| 2009-09-10 || Win ||align=left| Erhan Deniz ||  || Istanbul, Turkey || Decision || 5 || 3:00
|-
! style=background:white colspan=9 |
|-
|-  bgcolor="CCFFCC"
| 2009-08-22 || Win ||align=left| Zamig Athakishiyev || Ergen Ring Ateşi 8, Final || Istanbul, Turkey || KO (Low Kick) || 2 || 
|-
! style=background:white colspan=9 |
|-
|-  bgcolor="CCFFCC"
| 2009-08-22 || Win ||align=left| Sait Ali Muhammed || Ergen Ring Ateşi 8, Semi Finals || Istanbul, Turkey || KO || 2 || 
|-
|-  bgcolor="#CCFFCC"
| 2009-08-01 || Win ||align=left| Zamig Athakishiyev || Ergen Ring Ateşi 7  || Ankara, Turkey ||  ||  || 
|-
|-  bgcolor="CCFFCC"
| 2009-07 || Win ||align=left| Redouan Cairo ||  || Istanbul, Turkey || KO (Left hook) || 2 || 
|-
|-  bgcolor="CCFFCC"
| 2009-06 || Win ||align=left| Raoul Dennen  ||  || Turkey || TKO || 1 || 
|-
|-  bgcolor="CCFFCC"
| 2008-04 || Win ||align=left| Henriques Zowa || World Champions League || Turkey || Decision || 5 || 3:00
|-
|-  bgcolor="#FFBBBB"
| 2007-10-14 || Loss ||align=left| Stefan Leko || Kickboks Gala Istanbul || Istanbul, Turkey || Decision (Unanimous) || 3 || 3:00
|-
|-  bgcolor="#FFBBBB"
| 2007-05-19 || Loss ||align=left| Nathan Corbett || K-1 Scandinavia GP 2007 || Stockholm, Sweden || Decision (Unanimous) || 3 || 3:00 
|-
|-  bgcolor="#CCFFCC"
| 2007-05-19 || Win ||align=left| Ramazan Ramazanov || K-1 Scandinavia GP 2007 || Stockholm, Sweden || KO (Right hook) || 2 || 0:57 
|-
|-  bgcolor="#CCFFCC"
| 2006-12-06 || Win ||align=left| Vanni Faè || Kings Birthday Event || Bangkok, Thailand ||  ||  ||
|-
! style=background:white colspan=9 |
|-
|-  bgcolor="#CCFFCC"
| 2006-11-14 || Win ||align=left| Christian Walker || Phuket Promotion || Phuket, Thailand ||  ||  ||
|-
|-  bgcolor="#FFBBBB"
| 2005-05-12 || Loss ||align=left| Magomed Magomedov || WMC-S1 Super Fights Program || Bangkok, Thailand || Decision (Majority) || 5 ||3:00
|-
|-
| colspan=9 | Legend:

Filmography

Film

See also
List of male kickboxers

References

External links
Profile at FightLife.ru

1984 births
Living people
Russian male kickboxers
Chechen martial artists
Turkish people of Chechen descent
Russian people of Chechen descent
Chechen sportsmen
Gendargenoy